The Great Divide is an extended play by the New Zealand band Dragon. The EP was released digitally in November 2011.

During the press conference for Chase the Sun, band member Todd Hunter said “...fans can look out for several EP releases over the next 12 months.”  This, being the second Dragon EP release in three months.

Track listing
 "Rainy Day" – 3:39		
 "Call Out" – 3:42		
 "New Blue Moon" – 3:35		
 "Don't Look Like Jim" – 3:56		
 "Radio Song" – 2:57		
 "The Great Divide" – 3:57
 "Kumera Dreaming" – 2:53

Personnel
 Todd Hunter – bass, banjo, melodica
 Mark Williams – vocals
 Pete Drummond – drums, percussion, mandolin, keyboards, guitar, vocals, saxophone (on, Don't I look Like Jim) 
 Bruce Reid – guitar, lap steel, keyboards, vocals

Release history

References

Dragon (band) albums
2011 EPs
EPs by Australian artists